This is a list of developments of public housing in the United States.

Arizona
Phoenix, Arizona
Coffelt-Lamoreaux Homes (1953)

Arkansas
Little Rock, Arkansas
Jesse Powell Tower
Sunset Terrace Housing Units
Cumberland Tower
Hollinsworth Grove
Parris Tower
Highland Court
Amaelia B. Ives Homes
Booker Homes
Osceola, Arkansas

California
Anaheim
Lincoln Anaheim Phase II
Bakersfield
Oro Vista
Compton
Lutheran Gardens Apartments 
New Wilmington Arms 
East Palo Alto
Light Tree Apartments
Long Beach
Carmelitos Housing Project
Los Angeles
Avalon Gardens, Florence
Estrada Courts, Boyle Heights
Gonzaque Village, Watts
Imperial Courts, Watts
Jordan Downs, Watts
Lorena Plaza - construction cost (2020) = $750,000 / unit
Mar Vista Gardens, Del Rey
Morgan Place, Crenshaw
Nickerson Gardens, Watts
Pueblo Del Rio, Central-Alameda
Pueblo del Sol, Boyle Heights
Rainbow Apartments, Skid Row
Ramona Gardens, Boyle Heights
Rancho San Pedro, San Pedro
Rose Hill Courts, Rose Hills
San Fernando Gardens, Pacoima
Summit View Apartments - Sylmar, Los Angeles - construction cost (2020) = $740,000 / unit
William Mead Homes, Chinatown 
Marin City
Golden Gate Village
Oakland
Acorn Projects, West Oakland
Lockwood Gardens, East Oakland
Campbell Village Court, West Oakland
Cypress Village, West Oakland
Pittsburg
El Pueblo, West Pittsburg
Richmond
Las Deltas, North Richmond
Nystrum Village, South Richmond
Richmond Village (formally known as Easter Hill), South Richmond
Triangle Court, Iron Triangle, Central Richmond
Rodeo
Bayo Vista
Sacramento
New Helvetia
Seavey Circle, also known as Marina Vista
San Diego
Meadowbrook Apartments
President John Adams Manor
Sea Breeze Gardens, formerly known as the Bay Vista Apartments
San Francisco
Alice Griffith Projects (colloquially "Double Rock"), Bayview
Alemany Homes, Bernal Heights
Holly Courts, Bernal Heights
Hunters View Dwellings, Hunters Point
Hunters Point East/West, Hunters Point
La Salle Apartments, Hunters Point
Kirkwood, Hunters Point
Osceola Lane, Hunters Point
Northridge Dwellings, Hunters Point
Oakdale Projects, Hunters Point
Westpoint Projects, Hunters Point
Army Street Projets (Bernal Dwellings), Mission
Valencia Gardens, Mission
200 Randolph, Lakeview
Clementina Towers, South of Market
350 Ellis, Tenderloin
JFK Towers, Pacific Heights
Potrero Annex and Terrace, Potrero Hill
Ping Yuen, Chinatown
Great Highway Apartments, Sunset
Hayes Valley Apartments, Western Addition
Joan San Jules, Western Addition
Friendship Village, Western Addition
Martin Luther King/Marcus Garvey Square Apartments, Western Addition
Robert Pitts Homes, Western Addition
Westside Courts, Western Addition
Yerba Buena Plaza Annex (colloquially "Pink Palace"), Western Addition (no longer active)
Yerba Buena Plaza East, Western Addition
North Beach Place, North Beach
Geneva Towers, Visitacion Valley (demolished)
Sunnydale Housing Projects, Visitacion Valley
Stockton
Almond View Apartments

Connecticut
Norwalk
Washington Village
Waterbury
Berkeley Heights
Willamantic
Father Honan Terrace

Florida
Miami
Edison Courts
Edison Park
Scott Carver Housing Project (demolished)
Liberty Square
Lincoln Field Apartments
Brown Subs
Arthur Mays Villas
Pine Island I & II
Goulds Plaza
Goulds New Homes
Southridge (The Square) I & II
Richmond Homes
Perrine Gardens
Perrine Villas
Perrine Rainbow
Naranja(Sunset Pointe)
Modello
South Miami Housing
Grove Homes
Little Havana Homes
Joe Moretti Apartments
Culmer Gardens
Gwen Cherry (The Numbers)
Donn Gardens
Townpark
Annie Coleman Homes
Victory Homes
New Haven Gardens
Little River Terrace
Homestead Gardens
Rainbow village
West Palm Beach
Dunbar Village
Boca Raton
Dixie Manor 
Hialeah
La Esperanza
Milander Manor
Raul A. Martinez
Ruth A. Tinsman Pavilion
Vernon Ashley Plaza
Dale G. Bennett Villas
Donald F. Scott Villas
Hoffman Gardens
Holland Hall
James Bright Villas
Villa Mariposa
Vivian Villas
Tampa
Robles Park
North Boulvard Homes (demolished)
Central Park Village (demolished)
Ponce De Leon (demolished)
College Hill Homes (demolished)
Moses White (demolished)
Rembrandt Gardens
Jacksonville
Victoria Lakes
Lincoln Court
Courtney Maynord
HollyBrook

Georgia
Athens (Athens Housing Authority)
Parkview Homes
Broadacres Homes
Parkview Extension
Rocksprings Homes
Hancock Apartments
Hill & Chase Street Apartments
Herman & Vine Street Apartments
Vine/Arch Street Apartments
Dublin/East Broad Street Apartments
Athens/Atlanta Avenue Apartments
Jack R. Wells Homes
Vine Circle Apartments
Nellie B. Homes
College & Hoyt Street Apartments
Jessie B. Denney Tower
Bonnie Lane Apartments
Towne View Place
ACT I Homes (AHA's Homeownership Program)
Savannah Heights Neighborhood
Atlanta (Atlanta Housing Authority)
Techwood Homes
Bankhead Courts
Bowen Homes
Clark Howell
Palmer House
Roosevelt House
University Homes
John Hope Homes
Hidden Village Homes
Capitol Homes
Grady Homes
Antoine Graves
Eagan Homes
Alonzo F. Herndon Homes
Carver Homes
Harris Homes
John O. Chiles
Perry Homes
McDaniel-Glenn
Hollywood Court
Thomasville Heights
Gilbert Gardens/Poole Creek
Leila Valley
Englewood Manor
Eastlake Meadows
Jonesboro North
Jonesboro South
U-Rescue Villa
Kimberly Courts
Barge Road
Martin St Plaza
Westminster
Cosby Spear Memorial Tower
Hightower Manor
Juniper & 10th Highrise
Marian Road Highrise
Marietta Road Highrise
Cheshire Bridge Road Highrise
East Lake Highrise
Georgia Avenue Highrise
Hightower Manor
Peachtree Road Highrise
Piedmont Road Highrise
East Point
Hillcrest Homes
Creekside
OJ Hurt
Martail Homes
Washington Carver Homes
College Park
Boat Rock
Red Oak
Decatur
Allen Wilson Terrace
Swanton Heights
Spring Point
Oakview
Gateway
Augusta 
Lake Olmstead Homes 
Cherry Tree Crossing 
Oak Pointe
Allen Homes 
MM Scott Barton Village 
Dogwood Terrace 
Gilbert Manor (demolished) 
Underwood Homes (demolished)
Hinesville
Mission Ridge
Pineland
Regency
Marietta
Fort-Hill Homes
Clay Homes
Louisville (housing development)
Boston homes (housing development)

Hawaii
Oahu
Mayor wright homes
Kuhio park terrace
Kuhio homes
Kalihi valley homes (known as kam IV housing)
Halawa Housing (Puuwai Momi)
Wahiawa terrace
Palolo valley homes
Palolo homes
Puahala homes
Kaahumanu homes
Kamehameha homes
Maili I & II
Maui
Kahekili terrace (A&B) (known as uphousing & downhousing)
Big Island
Lokahi
Lanakila
Halealoha
Riverside

Illinois
Chicago (Chicago Housing Authority)
ABLA (Demolition completed 2007)
Altgeld Gardens (Renovated 2014)
Bridgeport Homes (Renovated 2008)
Cabrini–Green (William Green Homes Demolition completed May 2011; Frances Cabrini rowhouses remain)
Dearborn Homes (Renovated 2009)
Harold Ickes Homes (Demolition completed 2011)
Harrison Courts (Renovated 2009)
Henry Horner Homes (Demolition completed 2008)
Ida B. Wells Homes (Demolition completed August 2011)
Julia C. Lathrop Homes (Under renovation; NRHP listed in 2012)
Lake Parc Place/Lake Michigan High-rises (Lake Michigan High-rises demolished; Lake Parc Place renovated)
Lawndale Gardens (Renovated 2008)
LeClaire Courts (demolished 2010)
Lowden Homes (Renovated 2008)
Prairie Courts (demolished 2001)
Racine Courts (Renovated 2009)
Raymond Hilliard Homes (Renovated 2006)
Robert Taylor Homes (Demolition completed March 2007)
Rockwell Gardens (Demolition completed 2006)
Stateway Gardens (Demolition completed June 2007)
Trumbull Park Homes (Renovated 2008)
Wentworth Gardens (Renovated 2009)
Washington Park Homes (demolished 2002)
Peoria
Taft Homes
Harrison Homes
Sterling Towers
RiverWest

Indiana
Indianapolis
Mozel Sander Projects
Park Lafayette
Lockefield Gardens
Blackburn Terrace Projects (aka Baltimore Projects due to its location on Baltimore Avenue)
Beechwood Gardens Apartments
Hawthorne Place
Rowney Terrace
Twin Hills Projects
Stone Key Apartments
Muncie
Parkview Apartments
 Munsyana Homes

Kansas
Lawrence Douglas County Housing Authority

Kentucky
Lexington
Bluegrass-Aspendale
Charlotte Court
Wilson St.
Louisville
Beecher Terrace
Clarksdale Housing Complex
Cotter Homes
Iroquois homes
Southwick Homes

Louisiana
New Orleans (See Housing Authority of New Orleans)
St. Thomas Projects
Desire Projects
Florida Projects
Magnolia Projects
Melpomene Projects
Calliope Projects
Iberville Projects
St. Bernard Projects
Fischer Projects
Lafitte Projects
DeGaulle Manor

Maryland
Annapolis
Newtowne 20
Robinwood
Harbour House
Eastport Terrace
Bywater Mutual Homes
Annapolis Gardens
Obery Court
Baltimore
Flaghouse Homes
O'Donnell Heights
Perkins Homes
Murphy Homes (demolished)
Poe Homes
Cherry Hill Homes
Lexington Terrace (demolished)
Gilmore Homes
Latrobe Homes
Westport homes
Douglass Homes
Somerset Homes
McCullough Homes
Brooklyn Homes

Massachusetts
Boston (Boston Housing Authority)
 Mary Ellen McCormack (South Boston)
 Old Colony (South Boston)
 Basilica (Charlestown)
 Bunker Hill (Charlestown)
 Newtown (Charlestown)
 Mishawum (Charlestown)
 Commonwealth (Brighton)
 Fanueil (Brighton)
 Franklin Field Apartments (Dorchester)
 Franklin Hill (Dorchester)
 Heritage Apartments (East Boston)
 Orient Heights (East Boston)
 Maverick (East Boston)
 Fairmount (Hyde Park)
 Heath Street (Jamaica Plain)
 South Street (Jamaica Plain)
 Gallivan Boulevard Homes (Mattapan/Dorchester Line)
 Archdale (Roslindale)
 Washington-Beechland (Roslindale)
 Alice Heyward Taylor Apartments (Roxbury)
 Highland Park (Roxbury)
 Whittier Street Apartments (Roxbury)
 Madison Park (Roxbury/Mission Hill)
 Mission Main (Roxbury/Mission Hill)
 Camden (South End)
 Lenox Street Apartments (South End)
 Cathedral (South End)
 Rutland/East Springfield Street (South End)
 West Newton Street (South End)
Cambridge
 Washington Elms
 Lincoln Way
 Putnam Gardens
Holyoke (Holyoke Housing Authority)
 Beaudoin Village (Homestead Avenue)
 Lyman Terrace (Downtown)
 Toepfert Apartments (The Flats)
 Churchill Home (Churchill)
 Zielinski Apartments (Downtown)
 Coughlin Apartments (Churchill)
 Beaudry-Boucher Apartments (South Holyoke)
 Falcetti Apartments (Churchill)
 Rosary Towers (The Flats)
 Murphy Congregate House (Whiting Farms)
 Seibel Apartments (Highlands)
Somerville
Claredon Hill Housing Projects
Mystic Avenue Housing Projects

Michigan
Detroit
Brewster-Douglass
Herman Gardens
Jeffries Homes

Minnesota
Minneapolis
Elliot Towers
Hiawatha Towers
Charles Horn Towers
Little Earth
Riverside Plaza
Sumner Field Homes (demolished 1998)
Saint Paul
Central Homes
Dunedin Homes
Edgerton Hi-Rise
Mt. Airy Homes
Valley Tower

Missouri
St. Louis
Pruitt–Igoe (demolished)
Cochran Gardens (demolished)
Peabody Homes

Nebraska
Omaha
Omaha Housing Authority
Logan Fontenelle Housing Project
Ernie Chambers Court
Farnam Building

Nevada
Las Vegas
Sherman Gardens
Gerson Park (demolished)
Hullum Homes
Ernie Gragin Terrace (demolished)

New Jersey
Asbury Park
Lincoln Village
Boston Way Village
Asbury Park Village
Atlantic City
Walter J. Buzby Homes
Stanley Holmes Village
Camden
Westfield Acres (demolished)
Crestbury Apartments
McGuire Gardens (demolished)
Roosevelt Manor (demolished)
Ablett Village
Chelton Terrace (demolished)
East Orange
Arcadian Gardens (demolished)
Elizabeth
Mravlag Manor (Bayway)
Pioneer Homes (demolished)
Oakwood Plaza
Migliore Manor (demolished)
Hackensack
Oratam Court
Hoboken
Harrison Gardens
Andrew Jackson Gardens
Christopher Columbus Gardens
Irvington
Camptown Gardens
Jersey City
A. Harry Moore Homes (Duncan)(demolished)
Marion Gardens
Hudson Gardens
Curries Woods (partially demolished)
Lafayette Gardens (demolished)
Booker T. Washington Gardens
Arlington Gardens
Montgomery Gardens (partially demolished)
Holland Gardens
Salem Lafayette Apartments
Berry Gardens
Mount Holly
Mt. Holly Gardens
New Brunswick
Memorial Homes (demolished)
Schwartz Homes
Robeson Village
Newark
Brick Towers (demolished)
Baxter Terrace (demolished)
Prudential Apartments (Sing-Sing)
Stella Wright Homes (demolished)
Scudder Homes (partially demolished)
Christopher Columbus Homes (demolished)
Hayes Homes (demolished)
Seth Boyden Terrace (vacant)
Otto Kretchmer Homes (Dayton Street)(partially demolished)
Genesis Towers (vacant)
Hill Manor (demolished)
Garden Spires
John W. Hyatt Court (partially demolished)
Archbishop Walsh Homes (demolished)
Bradley Court
Pennington Court
Pueblo City
Douglass-Harrison Homes (demolished)
Felix Fuld Court (Little Bricks)(vacant)
Stephen Crane Village
Millard Terrell Homes (Riverview Court)
Orange
Father Rasi Homes (demolished)
Walter G. Alexander Homes (demolished)
Passaic
Alfred Speer Village
Vreeland Village
Paterson
Riverside Terrace
Alexander Hamilton Homes (Alabama)(demolished)
Riverview Towers
Dean McNulty Homes (demolished)
Christopher Columbus Homes (demolished)
Perth Amboy
John A. Delaney Homes (demolished)
Plainfield
Elmwood Gardens (demolished)
Liberty Village
Trenton
Donnelly Homes
Miller Homes (demolished)
Woodrow Wilson Homes
Oakland Park Apartments
Union City
Hillside Terrace
Columbian Court
West New York
Sunshine Gardens

New York
Buffalo
Glenny Drive Apartments also known as Kensington Heights (demolished)
Ellicott Mall (partially demolished and converted into privately owned Ellicott Town Center)
Marine Drive Apartments (formerly Dante Place)
Frederick Douglass Towers (formerly Talbert Mall)
Ferry Grider Apartments
Commodore Perry Homes
A.D. Price Courts
Jasper Parrish Homes
LaSalle Courts
Kenfield Homes
Kensington Gardens
Kowal
Langfield Home
Redwood Village
Shaffer Village
Willert Park Homes
Woodson Gardens (demolished)
New York City (See New York City Housing Authority)
Alfred E. Smith Houses, Manhattan
Amsterdam Houses, Manhattan
Baisley Park Houses, Queens
Baruch Houses, Manhattan
Bay View Houses, Brooklyn
Berry Houses, Staten Island
Bracetti Plaza, Manhattan
Breukelen Houses, Brooklyn
Bronx River Houses, Bronx
Carver Houses, Manhattan
Chelsea-Elliott Houses, Manhattan
Clinton Houses, Manhattan
Farragut Houses, Brooklyn
First Houses, Manhattan
Forest Houses, Bronx
Forest Hills Co-op Houses, Queens
Fort Greene Houses, Brooklyn
Frederick Douglass Houses, Manhattan
Fulton Houses, Manhattan
Glenwood Houses, Brooklyn
Gompers Houses, Manhattan
Gowanus Houses, Brooklyn
Grant Houses, Manhattan
Harlem River Houses, Manhattan
Hernandez Houses, Manhattan
Holmes Towers, Manhattan
Hope Gardens, Brooklyn
Isaacs Houses, Manhattan
James Monroe Houses, Bronx
LaGuardia Houses, Manhattan
Louis Heaton Pink Houses, Brooklyn
Lower East Side I Infill, Manhattan
Manhattan Plaza, Manhattan
Manhattanville Houses, Manhattan
Marcy Houses, Brooklyn
Mariners Harbor Houses, Staten Island
Morrisania Air Rights, Bronx
Patterson Houses, Bronx
Queensbridge Houses, Queens
Riis Houses, Manhattan
Robert F. Wagner Houses, Manhattan
Rutgers Houses, Manhattan
Sotomayor Houses, Bronx
South Jamaica Houses, Queens
St. Nicholas Houses, Manhattan
Stapleton Houses, Staten Island
Taylor–Wythe Houses, Brooklyn
Vladeck Houses, Manhattan 
Walt Whitman Houses, Brooklyn
Williamsburg Houses, Brooklyn
Wycoff Houses, Brooklyn
Syracuse
Almus Olver Towers
Benderson Heights
Fahey Court
James Geddes Rowhouses
McKinney Manor
Pioneer Homes
Ross Towers
Toomey Abbott Towers
Vinette Towers

Ohio
 Cincinnati
Beacon Glen
(The) Beechwood
Clinton Springs
(The) Evanston
Fernside Place
Findlater Gardens
Horizon Hills
Liberty Apartments
Maple Tower
Marianna Terrace
Marquette Manor
Millvale
Park Eden
Pinecrest
President
(The) Redding
(The) Riverview
San Marco
Setty Kuhn
Stanley Rowe Towers
Sutter View
Winton Terrace
 Cleveland (Cuyahoga Metropolitan Housing Authority)
Bellaire Garden (A&B)
Carver Park
Crestview Apartments
Lakeview Terrace
Miles Elmarge
Oakwood Villas
Olde Cedar
Outhwaite Homes
Springbrook
Wade Apartments
Willson Tower
 Columbus
Avondale
Chestnut Grove
Eastmoor Square
Elim Manor
Four Pointe
Glenview Estates
Indian Meadows
Jenkins Terrace
Legacy Pointe at Poindexter
Maplewood Heights
The Meadows
New Village Place
Ohio Townhouses
Poindexter Place
Poindexter Village (demolished)
Post Oak Station
Rosewind
Sawyer Manor
Sugar Grove Square Apartments
Thornwood Commons
Trevitt Heights
The Whitney
Worley Terrace
 Dayton
Desoto Bass Court
Arlington Court (demolished)
Dunbar Manor (demolished)
Parkside Holmes (demolished)
Washington Arms
Caliph Court
Mt. Crest Court
Hilltop Homes
Edgewood Court (demolished)

 Toledo
Albertus Brown Homes
Brand Whitlock Homes
Charles F. Weiler Homes
Cherrywood Apts.
John Holland Estates
Moody Manor
McClinton-Nunn Homes
New Town Apts.
Port Lawrence Homes
Vistula Manor

Oklahoma
Oklahoma City
Will Rogers Courtsu
Tulsa
Apache Manor
Vernon Manor
Parkview Terrace
Comanche Park
The Meadows
Mohawk Manor 
East Central Village
Pioneer Plaza
Hewgley Terrace
Riverview Park
Sandy Park
South Haven Manor
LaFortune Tower
Seminole Hills/Whitlow
Inhofe Plaza
Murdock Villa
Towne Square

Oregon
Portland
New Columbia

Pennsylvania
Bethlehem
Pembroke Village, East Side
Philadelphia
See Public housing in Philadelphia
Pittsburgh
St. Clair Village
Bedford Dwellings

Puerto Rico

El coto (Arecibo, PR)
La meseta (Arecibo, PR)
La Trina (Arecibo, PR)

South Carolina
Charleston
Robert Mills Manor
William Enston Home

Columbia
Gonzales Gardens

Tennessee
Memphis
Dixie Homes
LeMoyne Gardens

Texas
Austin
Santa Rita Courts
Rosewood Courts
Chalmers Courts
Meadowbrook
Booker T. Washington
Dallas
Turner Court
Fort Worth, Texas
Butler Place
Caville
Galveston
Cedar Terrace (demolished)
Magnolia Homes (demolished)
Oleander Homes (demolished)
Holland House

Houston
Clayton Homes
Cuney Homes
Ewing Apartments
Forest Green Townhomes
Garden City Apartments
Historic Oaks of Allen Parkway Village
Irvington Place
Kelly Court
Lincoln Park
Long Drive Townhomes
Wilmington House
Kennedy Place
Oxford Place
Victory Apartments
Heatherbrook
San Antonio
Alazán-Apache Courts
Cassiano Homes
Lincoln Heights Courts
Villa Veramendi Homes
Wheatley Courts (demolition 2014)
Victoria Courts (demolition 2000) 
San Juan Homes (demolition 2013)
Menchaca Homes (demolished)
Mirasol Homes (demolished)
East Terrace Homes (demolished)
Sutton Homes (demolished)

Washington
Seattle
Yesler Terrace
Holly Park
High Point
Westwood

Washington, D.C.
Arthur Capper/Carrollsburg
Carroll Apartments
Barry Farm
Benning Terrace 
Claridge Towers
Colorado Apartments
Columbia Road
Edgewood
Elvans Road
Fort Dupont Dwellings
Fort Lincoln
Garfield Terrace
Glencrest
Greenleaf
Harvard Towers
Henson Ridge
Highland Dwellings
Hopkin Apartments
Kelly Miller
Kenilworth Courts
Knox Hill
Langston Terrace Dwellings
Ledroit Apartments
Lincoln Heights
Lincoln Road
Marigold
Marley Ridge
Montana Terrace
Oak Street Apartments
Ontario Road/McDermott
Park Morton Apartments
Potomac Gardens
Richardson Dwellings
Sibley Plaza
Stoddert Terrace
Sursum Corda Cooperative
Syphax Gardens
Townhomes on Capitol Hill
Triangle View
The Villager
Wade Apartments
Wheeler Creek
Woodland Terrace

Wisconsin
Milwaukee (Housing Authority of the City of Milwaukee)
Arlington Court
Becher Court
Berryland
Cherry Court
College Court
Convent Hill
Highland Gardens
Highland Homes
Hillside Terrace
Hillside Terrace Highrise
Holton Terrace
Lapham Park
Townhomes at Carver Park
Lincoln Court
Locust Court
Merrill Park
Mitchell Court
Northlawn
Olga Village
Parklawn
Riverview
Southlawn
Southlawn Park
Westlawn

References 

public housing developments
Public